Douglas Creighton  was a Canadian journalist who co-founded the Toronto Sun with Peter Worthington.

Career 

In 1948 Creighton joined the Toronto Telegram as a police reporter. He advanced to the position of city editor in 1967 and rose to the position of managing editor in 1969. John Bassett, the owner of the Telegram, shuttered the paper in 1971. Creighton founded the Toronto Sun with many of the Telegram's former employees and led the Sun to become a national chain of newspapers under the banner of Sun Media.

Creighton was appointed an Officer of the Order of Canada in 1991.

Creighton's career came to an end in 1992, when the board of directors of the Toronto Sun Publishing Corp unexpectedly removed Creighton from his position as CEO.

References 

Toronto Sun editors
Canadian newspaper chain founders
Officers of the Order of Canada
1930s births
2004 deaths
Year of birth uncertain
20th-century Canadian newspaper publishers (people)